George Washington Adams (April 12, 1801 – April 30, 1829) was an American attorney and politician. He was the eldest son of John Quincy Adams, the sixth president of the United States. Adams served in the Massachusetts House of Representatives and on the Boston City Council. He is believed to have died by suicide at age 28.

Biography 
George Washington Adams was born in Berlin, the capital of the Kingdom of Prussia, on April 12, 1801. He was a member of the distinguished Adams family. Adams was the eldest son of John Quincy Adams, the sixth president of the United States, who was then serving as a diplomatic representative of the United States, and his English-born wife Louisa Catherine Adams. He was named for the first president. His grandfather John Adams was the first vice president of the United States and also the second president. He was born a month after his grandfather left office.

Adams's grandmother, Abigail Adams, was unhappy with the decision of her son to name the child after George Washington and not after her husband. She thought the decision "ill judged" and "wrong," adding that John Adams also seemed offended. John Quincy Adams's second son John Adams II (1803–1834) was named after his grandfather.

Adams graduated from Harvard University in the Class of 1821 and studied law. After briefly practicing as an attorney, he ran for state office. He was elected to the Massachusetts House of Representatives in 1826 and served one year. In 1828, Adams served on the Boston City Council. He delivered an Independence Day speech, "An Oration delivered at Quincy, on the Fifth of July, 1824", which was later published as a pamphlet.

Adams disappeared on April 30, 1829, while on board the steamship Benjamin Franklin in Long Island Sound during passage from Boston to Washington, D.C. He was last seen at about 2 A.M., and his hat and cloak were found on deck, leading to the conclusion that he had intentionally jumped. His body washed ashore on June 10. An alcoholic, Adams had left notes hinting that he intended to kill himself; he had appeared to be delusional while on the ship, asking the captain to return to shore and declaring that the other passengers were conspiring against him. The consensus in news accounts of the time and among historians subsequently is that he died by suicide by drowning after he jumped from the Benjamin Franklin.

Family 
Adams and his brothers Charles and John were all rivals for the same woman, their cousin Mary Catherine Hellen, who lived with the John Quincy Adams family after the death of her parents.  In 1828, John Adams II married Mary Hellen at a ceremony in the White House, and both his brothers refused to attend.

Adams fathered an out-of-wedlock child with a mistress, Eliza Dolph. Dolph was the chambermaid to Dr. Thomas Welsh, the Adams family's Boston doctor. She had a child in December 1828 and was moved to another location so Adams could visit her and the baby in secrecy. The child never had a recorded first name and a letter mentions "Eliza Dolph has gained her health and lost her child," suggesting the child died in infancy.

Family tree

Notes

Bibliography
 

1801 births
1829 deaths
Adams political family
American politicians who committed suicide
American Unitarians
Children of presidents of the United States
Suicides by drowning in the United States
Harvard University alumni
Boston City Council members
Members of the Massachusetts House of Representatives
Suicides in New York (state)
19th-century American politicians
19th-century American lawyers
American people of English descent
1820s suicides
Thomas Johnson family